Deh Now-e Yarahmadi (also Romanized as Deh Now-e Yāraḩmadī, Deh-e Now-e Yār Aḩmadī, Dehnow-e Yār Aḩmadī, and Deh Now-e Yār Aḩmadī; also known as Deh-e Now) is a village in Nehzatabad Rural District, in the Central District of Rudbar-e Jonubi County, Kerman Province, Iran. At the 2006 census, its population was 183, in 34 families.

References 

Populated places in Rudbar-e Jonubi County